John Allan Ledward  (22 April 1909 – 22 July 1997) was an Australian cricketer and cricket administrator. 

Ledward played 22 first-class cricket matches as a batsman for Victoria between 1935 and 1939. His highest score was 154 against Tasmania in 1935-36.

After 24 years with the National Bank of Australasia, Ledward served as secretary of the Victorian Cricket Association from 1951 to 1973, and secretary of the Australian Cricket Board of Control from 1954 to 1960. He was appointed MBE for his services to cricket in 1962. He was assistant manager of the Australian cricket team in England in 1964, and one of the key organisers of the Rest of the World tour in 1971-72.

He played for Richmond in Melbourne district cricket for more than 20 years, captaining them to their first premiership in 1946-47. He was posthumously selected as captain of the Tigers Team of the Century.

See also
 List of Victoria first-class cricketers

References

External links
 

1909 births
1997 deaths
Australian cricketers
Australian cricket administrators
Victoria cricketers
Cricketers from Melbourne
Australian Members of the Order of the British Empire